So Kyong-jin (born 8 January 1994) is a North Korean international football player.

Career

Club
So played for April 25 in their 2017 AFC Cup group match against Erchim on 14 March 2017.

Career statistics

International goals
Scores and results list North Korea's goal tally first.

Honours 
North Korea U-23
Runners-up
 Asian Games: 2014

References

External links 
 
 So Kyong-jin at DPRKFootball

1994 births
Living people
North Korean footballers
North Korea international footballers
Asian Games medalists in football
Footballers at the 2014 Asian Games
Association football midfielders
Asian Games silver medalists for North Korea
Medalists at the 2014 Asian Games
21st-century North Korean people